PT. Airfast Indonesia is an air carrier based in Tangerang, Indonesia in Greater Jakarta. It specialises in contract operations, aviation management services and charter passenger and cargo services to the oil, mining and construction industries in Indonesia and other countries in the area. It is also involved in aerial mapping, survey flights, heli-logging and medical evacuation services. Its main base is Soekarno-Hatta International Airport, Jakarta. Airfast Indonesia is listed in Category 1 by Indonesian Civil Aviation Authority for airline safety quality. In 2009 Airfast Indonesia was one of five airlines taken off a blacklist of airlines not allowed in European airspace due to safety concerns.

History 

The airline was established and started operations in 1971. It was established to provide helicopters and fixed-wing aircraft to the oil exploration industry in Indonesia, initially as an Australian-Indonesian joint venture, but evolved into a fully Indonesian-owned and operated company in 1982 when it acquired Zamrud Aviation Corp. It was owned by Frank Reuneker (53%) and  other shareholders (47%).

Services 

Helicopter services include onshore and offshore passenger transport, medical evacuation flights, internal and external load transport, drilling rig moves, construction support and aerial survey work.
Fixed-wing services include passenger and cargo charters, medical evacuation flights, non-scheduled airline operations and aerial survey work.

Destinations

Fleet 

The Airfast Indonesia fleet includes the following aircraft (as of September 2018):

As of June 2013 the airline also operated the following aircraft:
2 Boeing 737-200 
1 CASA 212-200
1 Embraer Legacy 600
1 BAe-146-100
1 Beech 1900D
3 Bell 412 & 412EP
1 Bell 212
2 Bell 407
2 Eurocopter AS 350
1 Mi-171

In addition, the carrier has also ordered 12 Boeing 737-800s and 8 Airbus A320s.

Accidents and incidents
On 28 April 1981, Douglas C-47A PK-OBK crashed on approach to Simpang Tiga Airport, Pekanbaru, whilst on a non-scheduled passenger flight. Nine of the 17 people on board were killed.
On 15 August 1984, Douglas C-47A PK-OBC crashed into a mountain near Wamena. Two of the three people on board were killed.
On 16 March 2012, a Eurocopter AS350B3 registered PK-ODA carrying 3 people slammed into a cliff while flying over Papua. Everyone on board, including the New Zealand pilot, were killed instantly in the crash. The crash was categorized as CFIT.

References

External links

Official website

Airlines of Indonesia
Airlines established in 1971
Indonesian companies established in 1971
Indonesian brands